Johannes "Hans" Riegel Sr. (4 April 1893 – 31 March 1945) was a German confectioner who invented the gummy bear in 1922 and founded the Haribo company. He was married to Gertrud (née Vianden).

References 

1893 births
1945 deaths
Businesspeople in confectionery
German company founders
20th-century German businesspeople
20th-century German inventors
Gummi candies